Shoulderbone Creek is a stream in the U.S. state of Georgia. It is a tributary to the Oconee River.

Shoulderbone Creek received its name in the 1780s, but the reason this name was applied is unknown.

References

Rivers of Georgia (U.S. state)
Rivers of Hancock County, Georgia